Bolajoko Olubukunola Olusanya is a Nigerian paediatrician and social entrepreneur. She is a specialist in audiological medicine.

Early life 

Olusanya has congenital mid-frequency hearing loss, but was not diagnosed until she was 33. She studied medicine at the University of Ibadan, graduating in 1982. She then trained as a paediatrician at the UCL Great Ormond Street Institute of Child Health and the Donald Winnicott Centre, both in London. After she completed her training in Nigeria, she faced a choice between either following a purely academic career or becoming a social entrepreneur, deciding to take the latter path.

Career 
Olusanya launched Hearing International Nigeria (HING) in 1999. She later formed the Nigerian Dyslexia Association and then combined it with HING into the Centre for Healthy Start Initiative in 2011. Between 2003 and 2007, she went back to University College London to work on a PhD in paediatrics and audiological medicine. Her PhD, awarded in 2008, was entitled "Infant hearing screening models for the early detection of permanent childhood hearing loss in Nigeria". As of 2020, Olusanya had published over 200 articles in academic journals. In 2019, she joined the Lancet Commission for Global Hearing Loss, a World Health Organization (WHO) initiative to treat deafness globally. According to Olusanya, the main causes of hearing loss in Nigeria were electricity generators, prescription antibiotics and the continual presence of noise.

Olusanya is a director of Global Research on Developmental Disabilities Collaborators (GRDDC), a group of paediatric experts funded by the Bill and Melinda Gates Foundation and the Institute for Health Metrics and Evaluation. In 2018, it published research in The Lancet demonstrating that in Nigeria there were 2.5 million children with developmental disabilities in 2016, as opposed to 1.5 million in 1990. Developmental disabilities are defined as health conditions which affect children long-term, such as autism spectrum disorder, attention deficit hyperactivity disorder, cerebral palsy, Down syndrome and hearing loss.

Selected works

Accolades 
Olusanya was awarded the Aram Glorig Award by the International Society of Audiology in 2018.

References 

Year of birth missing (living people)
Nigerian women academics
Nigerian social entrepreneurs
Alumni of University College London
University of Ibadan alumni
Nigerian pediatricians
Audiologists
Living people